is Konami's sound team. It is often confused with 矩形波倶楽部 (Kukeiha Club), Konami's in-house band that has released albums consisting of their studio performances. They are primarily responsible for the sound and music in the majority of Konami video games. One of their best known works is the soundtrack to Gensō Suikoden — the majority of the material being composed by member Miki Higashino (Miki-Chan). Motoaki Furukawa (main arranger and guitarist) has been known to perform live with members not part of the in-house band, credited under "Konami Kukeiha Club". For example, disc 1 of the Konami All Stars: The Senryo-Bako Heisei 4 Nen Ban album (KICA-1053~55) is titled "Konami Kukeiha Club Live in Tōkyō."

Members (past and present)
Aki Hata
Akihiro Juichiya
Akiko Hashimoto
Akiko Ito
Akira Souji
Akira Yamaoka
Atsushi Fujio
Ayako Nishigaki
Harumi Ueko
Hidehiro Funauchi
Hideki Shikama
Hidenori Maezawa
Hideto Inoue
Hideyuki Eto
Hiroe Noguchi
Hirofumi Taniguchi
Hiroshi Tamawari
Iku Mizutani
Jun Chuma
Jun Funahashi
Junichiro Kaneda
Junya Nakano
Kaori Kinouchi
Katsuhiko "Nazo²" Suzuki
Kazuhiko Uehara
Kazuhiro Senoo
Kazuhito Imai
Kazuki Muraoka
Keizo Nakamura
Kenichi Matsubara
Kenichiro Fukui
Keroppy Inoue
Kinuyo Yamashita
Kiyohiko Yamane
Kiyohiro Sada
Kouji Murata
Kozo Nakamura
M. Shirakawa
Mariko Egawa
Masae Nakashima
Masahiko Kimura
Masahiro Ikariko
Masanari Iwata
Masanori Adachi
Masanori Adachi
Masanori Oouchi
Mayuko Kageshita
Michiru Yamane
Miki Higashino
Mikio Saito
Motoaki Furukawa
Mutsuhiko Izumi
Naoki Maeda
Naomitsu Ariyama
Nobuyuki Akena
Noriko Gushiken
Noriko Takahashi
Norio Hanzawa
Noritada Matsukawa
S. Masuda
Saiko Miki
Satoe Terashima
Satoko Miyawaki
Seiichi Fukami
Seiya Murai
Shigehiro Takenouchi
Shigemasa Matsuo
Shigeru Fukutake
Shinji Tasaka
Shinya Sakamoto
Takahito Uenishi
Tappi Iwase
Taro Kudo
Tomoko Nishikawa
Tomoko Sano
Tomoya Tomita
Tsutomu Ogura
Tsuyoshi Sekito
Yousuke Uno
Yasuhiko Manno
Yoshiaki Hatano
Yoshihiko Koezuka
Yoshinori Sasaki
Yoshiyuki Hagiwara
You Takamine
Yuichi Asami
Yuichi Sakakura
Yuji Takenouchi
Yukie Morimoto
Yuko Chan
Yuko Kurahashi

References

External links
 古川もとあきStation: Motoaki Furukawa Official Web Site
 Tappy Iwase Official Site
 Composer profile at OverClocked ReMix
 
 Dracula Battle Perfect Selection at VGMuseum

Japanese instrumental musical groups
Japanese rock music groups
Instrumental rock musical groups
Video game music cover bands
Video game musicians